The Clio Williams Maxi is a factory evolution of the Clio Williams Gr., a rally car introduced in early 1995 under kit-car rules (Gr. A7K). It was used to represent the brand in various national championships such as the French Rally Championship in the hands of Philippe Bugalski and Jean Ragnotti, the Belgian Rally Championship with Bernard Munster, and in the British Rally Championship with Alain Oreille and Robbie Head, with the French and British rally teams also competing in the World Rally Championship. The most notable exterior differences are wider wheel arches to accommodate bigger wheels and wider track, different front and rear bumpers, and a carbon fibers rear wing.
 
Other exterior differences are another bonnet vent for dissipating heat from the engine bay and fuel cap in a different location. The most commonly used rims were Speedline 2012 "Acropoli Due" and Speedline 2010 (used mostly on the front wheels).

Suspension (3-way adjustable) was made by Proflex and the track was widened to 1590mm. The Maxi had much thicker anti-roll bars (up to 35mm for tarmac stages). The hubs were made of aluminium and were bespoke items. The rear beam was also modified with thicker ARB and allowed different camber and toe settings.

The brakes were made by Alcon. The front discs were on aluminium bells and were 332mm in diameter with 4 pot Alcon calipers. The rear discs were 266mm in diameter with 2 pot Alcon calipers.

Roll cage and shell reinforcements were done by Matter France.
 
The F7R engine was tuned by Sodemo and produced around 250hp in early evolutions (around 275hp for the last evolutions with a destroked engine). The main difference to the Gr.A car was the use of individual throttle bodies and even wilder cams. Other differences include a modified head for improved gas flow and a modified block for better cooling. Extremely wild cams with maximum lift of up to 15mm required the use of solid lifters and titanium valves, springs, and retainers. Pistons and rods were made by Pankl. The pistons were a forged "slipper" design and the rods were forged H section with a custom 150mm length to compensate for the different piston compression height. Compression ratio was 12.5:1 and it ran on special racing fuel. Exhaust manifold was a 4-2-1 design and was made from Inconel alloy. The clutch was made by AP Racing.

Transmission was either a 6-speed Sadev manual or 6-speed RST Hewland sequential gearbox (7-speed sequential gearbox from the Mégane Maxi can be retrofitted, ut is not homologated). The Clio Maxi was one of the first, if not the first, rally cars with a sequential gearbox.

The interior featured an instrument panel made by Stack and Magnetti Marelli, and seats were made by Sabelt or Sparco. By 1996, when the Clio Williams Maxi's successor came out (Mégane Maxi), 50 cars were made.

More cars were made from kits and sold directly to the customers.

Renault vehicles
Subcompact cars
Euro NCAP superminis
Hatchbacks